"Mother Nature" is a 1972 R&B single by The Temptations. It was written by Nick Zesses and Dino Fekaris and produced by Norman Whitfield, and was the first single on their album All Directions.

Personnel
 Lead vocals by Dennis Edwards
 Background vocals by Damon Harris, Richard Street, Otis Williams and Melvin Franklin
 Instrumentation by The Funk Brothers

Chart performance
"Mother Nature"  was a top 30 hit on the R&B charts at number 27, but failed to make an impact on the pop charts, peaking at only number 92.

References

Song recordings produced by Norman Whitfield
The Temptations songs
Gordy Records singles
1972 singles
Songs written by Dino Fekaris
1972 songs